Eroğlu is a surname. Notable people with the surname include:

Beytullah Eroğlu (born 1995), Turkish Paralympic swimmer
Derviş Eroğlu (born 1938), politician of Northern Cyprus
Erbil Eroğlu (born 1993), Turkish basketball player
Mehmet Eroğlu (born 1948), Turkish novelist
Merve Nur Eroğlu (born 1993), Turkish female Paralympic archer
Şeref Eroğlu (born 1975), Turkish sport wrestler
Veysel Eroğlu (born 1948), Turkish politician
Ahsen Eroğlu (born 1994), Turkish Actress

Turkish-language surnames